Optatissima pax  is an encyclical of Pope Pius XII  on prescribing public prayers for social and world peace given at Rome, at St. Peter's, the 18th day of December in the year 1947,  the ninth of his pontificate.

Two years after World War II, peace still is in uncertain balance. People are in suspense  and in several nations  class conflicts are being incited to mutual hatred. The Pope considers the  crisis of peace a serious one.  The economic system of many nations has been dislocated  as a result of  military expenditures and  war related destruction. Working people are exploited and incited to discord.

Peace can only be secured  by working together in harmony,  cooperation, and  peaceful labour.   It is  the duty of all to realize that the world crisis is  serious.  All, especially the rich,  must  place the common welfare above their private advantage and profits. It is most urgent,  to reconcile the hearts of men. Public and private life must return to Christ  as soon as possible. The Pope  places much trust in the prayers of innocent children, whose prayer   for peace and reconciliation he  requests during the Christmas season.  The Pontiff closes the encyclical by imparting his Apostolic Benediction.

References

Encyclicals of Pope Pius XII
December 1947 events
1947 in Christianity